Ramouseh is a suburb of Aleppo, Syria, that has an industrial zone and a major bus station for intercity lines.

Formerly a village near Aleppo, it was the site where Sayf al-Dawla's army would camp (Yāqūt). A battle between an army from Aleppo and an invading army from Damascus took place there during a war between the two cities in February/March 1602 (ʾAl-Ghazziyy). The Artillery School massacre took place in Ramouseh on June 16, 1979.

References
Yāqūt, Muʿjam ʾal-buldān.
Kāmil ʾal-Ghazziyy, Nahr ʾadh-Dhahab fiy Tārikh Ḥalab.

Neighborhoods of Aleppo